Linden Porco (born August 29, 1996) is a Canadian dwarf actor. He is 32 inches (81 centimeters) tall and is best known for his role as a body double in the 2006 American film Little Man. He was born with cartilage hair hypoplasia, a form of dwarfism that stunts growth, but allows for proportional development.

Filmography

Film

Television

References

External links 

Linden Porco at Yahoo! Movies

1996 births
Canadian male child actors
Living people
Actors with dwarfism